Symphyotrichum greatae (formerly Aster greatae) is a species of flowering plant in the family Asteraceae endemic to California and known by the common name Greata's aster.

Description
Symphyotrichum greatae is a colonizing perennial herb growing from a long rhizome. The leaves and parts of the stems are hairy.

The inflorescence is an open array of flower heads amidst leaflike bracts. The flower head contains many pale violet to nearly white ray florets and a center of yellow disc florets. The fruit is a hairy cypsela.

Distribution and habitat
Symphyotrichum greatae is endemic to the San Gabriel Mountains of Southern California, where it grows in damp areas in the canyons of the southern slopes above the Los Angeles Basin.

Conservation
NatureServe lists it as Imperiled (G2) worldwide.

Citations

References

External links
 

greatae
Endemic flora of California
Natural history of the Transverse Ranges
~
~
Natural history of Los Angeles County, California
Plants described in 1902
Taxa named by Samuel Bonsall Parish